Dhiraj Bora (30 September 1951 – 19 June 2021) was an Indian physicist, educationist and professor. Bora, known as a plasma scientist, was a former director of the Institute of Plasma Research located in Gandhinagar, Gujarat. He was the chief scientist of the ITER – India. He won the Kamal Kumari National Award in 2012 in recognition of his contribution to the field of science. In 2016 he was elected as the vice-chancellor of  Assam Science and Technology University and held the post until his death. He died on 19 June 2021.

Early life and education

Dhiraj Bara was born in Guwahati on 30 September 1951. His father was Lalit Chandra Bora and mother Kusum Bora. He was educated at Senikuthi Primary School in Guwahati. He was then educated at Manik Chandra Barua ME School. He then joined Cotton Collegiate  School but got a scholarship from the Government of India and enrolled in the Daly College in Indore, Madhya Pradesh in class VII. After completing class XII in 1968, he enrolled in St. Stephen's College under Delhi University and graduated with a bachelor of science degree from it. In 1975, he received a master's degree in experimental physics from the People's Friendship University in Moscow, USSR. He then received his PhD in 1979 from the Physical Research Laboratory  under the Gujarat University.

References

1951 births
2021 deaths
People from Guwahati
20th-century Indian physicists
21st-century Indian physicists
Indian plasma physicists
Heads of universities and colleges in India
Peoples' Friendship University of Russia alumni
St. Stephen's College, Delhi alumni
Gujarat University alumni